Kordia aquimaris is a Gram-negative, strictly aerobic, non-spore-forming and non-motile bacterium from the genus Kordia which has been isolated from seawater from the coast near the Taichung harbour in Taiwan. Kordia aquimaris produces zeaxanthin.

References

Flavobacteria
Bacteria described in 2013